Suli Daraq (also Romanized as Sūlī Daraq; also known as Sul’dera and Suli Darreh) is a village in Mavazekhan-e Shomali Rural District, Khvajeh District, Heris County, East Azerbaijan Province, Iran. At the 2006 census, its population was 41, in 11 families.

References 

Populated places in Heris County